This is a list of the NCAA outdoor champions in the 220 yard low hurdles until they were discontinued in 1959.  Hand timing was used throughout the duration of this event.  The event was not held in the Olympic years of 1924, 1948, 1952 and 1956, in favor of the 400 metres hurdles.  It was held in the Olympic year of 1936, and was part of Jesse Owens multi-world-record-breaking meet.

Champions
Key
y=yards
w=wind aided
A=Altitude assisted

References

GBR Athletics

External links
NCAA Division I men's outdoor track and field

Hurdles Low NCAA Men's Division I Outdoor Track and Field Championships
Outdoor track, men
220 hurdles